The Score is an American alternative rock duo formed in New York City in 2011, now based in Los Angeles. The group consists of Eddie Anthony Ramirez (lead vocals, guitar) and Edan Chai Dover (backing vocals, keys, producer). Chris Coombs and Logan Baldwin are touring members for the band. They were signed to Republic Records in 2015 after their song "Oh My Love" was featured in an advertising campaign for Asda supermarkets.

History

2011–2013: Early Years 
Eddie Anthony and Edan Chai Dover formed the group in 2011 and made collaborative demos on SoundCloud. In 2012 the band released two new singles, Dancing Shoes and Don't Wanna Wake Up, on their YouTube channel. They also announced that their debut EP would be released in early 2013.

In 2013 the band released a cover of Sweet Nothing by Calvin Harris on YouTube. They also started making covers every Sunday and released them on YouTube as a free download. These covers were called ScoreSundays. They released their lead single to their debut EP, Not Just Another Way, in early 2013. Not long after the single's release their debut EP was canceled. It is unknown why they did so and what the EP was going to be called. The only thing known was that it was supposed to feature Not Just Another Way, and unreleased demos such as Hit List, 4 AM, and Almost.

2014–2015: The Score EP, The Score EP 2, Where Do You Run EP, and Singles 
The Score released their debut EP, The Score EP, in 2014, which features earlier songs, Dancing Shoes and Don't Wanna Wake Up. The EP also contained their earlier released covers of Say Something and Holy Grail (as bonus tracks), as well as no new songs, Til The Stars Burn Blue, Haunted, and This Beating Heart (and a ScoreSundays Acoustic version of Dancing Shoes, as a bonus track). The Score continued to release weekly ScoreSundays throughout the year.

The Score announce the release of their second EP, The Score EP 2, in 2015 with the lead single, Better Than One. The rest of their EP included then-new tracks Lost You, Fall For Me (feat Kate Lynne Logan), In The Dark, Real Life, and a remix of their song, Lost You, with Wavve Pilot.

The duo gained recognition in early 2015, when the British supermarket chain Asda (owned by Walmart) used their single "Oh My Love" in a major advertising campaign titled "Save Money, Live Better". According to Asda, part of the reason why they selected the song was because "they were unsigned and unknown".
The song's placement in the advertisement helped The Score rise in the public eye, and "Oh My Love" reached number 43 on the UK Singles Chart in July 2015. That same year, the track became the most-detected song from an advertisement by the Shazam music identification service. The song also appeared in the 2015 film Alvin and the Chipmunks: The Road Chip. The Score released a single, Catching Fire, shortly after the release of Oh My Love.

Following the success of "Oh My Love", The Score signed a record deal with Republic Records. They released their extended play, Where Do You Run, in September 2015. The Score released their cover of Post Malone's song White Iverson shortly after.

2016: On And On and Unstoppable EP
On April 8, 2016, the duo released the song "Up" for the Sing Street Original Motion Picture Soundtrack. The duo also released the single "On and On", which was featured in the spring programming lineup for HBO. After announcing on social media that a new EP would be released, The Score officially released the Unstoppable EP on September 23, 2016. The title track was later featured in the 2017 Power Rangers film. In 2017, "Unstoppable" was also used as the theme song for the World Series of Poker (WSOP) main event, streamed live on ESPN2 and Poker Central beginning on July 8. In 2018, the song was used in advertising campaigns for the Jeep Grand Cherokee. Unstoppable was also used in one of Dude Perfect's videos titled "Water Bottle Flip Edition | Dude Perfect" released on July 18, 2016. Unstoppable also received a gold award from RIAA, making it the band's biggest hit to date.

2017–2018: ATLAS
The Score released an EP called Myths & Legends on April 14, 2017, including their singles, "Revolution" and "Legend", which were later included on their debut studio album. The album, titled ATLAS, was released on October 13, 2017. As a part of this album, other songs such as "Unstoppable", "Miracle", "Never Going Back" "Shakedown", "Who I Am", Strange", "Only One", "Believe" and "Tightrope" were released.

"Legend" was featured in the soundtrack for NHL 18, released on September 15, 2017. It also featured in the soundtrack for Asphalt 9: Legends and Apex Legends released on July 25, 2018. A stripped version of the Myths and Legends EP was released on August 11, 2017.

In 2018, the band opened for Echosmith to support their Inside A Dream tour. In the fall of 2018, they were scheduled to return in their Revolution Tour with special guests The Orphan The Poet and Birthday.

In mid 2018 The Score released a single titled "Glory". They released the single, "Stronger", on September 7, 2018. According to their Twitter account, the song signifies a new era for the band. The official music video for the song, directed by Jason Lester, was released on YouTube on October 4, 2018, and it was followed soon after by the release of another single, "The Fear".

2019–2021: Carry On
On January 29, 2019, The Score announced that an EP titled Pressure would be released on February 1, 2019. Included the song: "Dreamin'" featuring American rapper, blackbear. It also included the previously released singles, "Glory", "Stronger" and "The Fear". Other new releases were, "Born For This" and "Under The Pressure".

On May 24, 2019, The Score released a new single titled "Stay". On August 1, 2019, The Score announced their new EP, also titled Stay, which was released on August 9. It includes six songs, including the title track. On December 13, 2019, the band released "Bulletproof" featuring Xylø, for the end credits of the Netflix film 6 Underground.

Since the start of the 2019–20 football season, Norwich City F.C. have used the single "Stronger" in their video package before all of the team's home matches at Carrow Road in the Premier League.

On April 22, 2020, the band released a new single titled "Best Part", on April 24. On June 19, 2020, the band released a new song titled "The Champion".

On July 20, 2020, the band revealed the lyrics for their upcoming song titled "All of Me" featuring a surprise feature by Blink 182's drummer, Travis Barker, as well as promising a signed lyric sheet to the first five to guess the feature. The song was released on July 24.
Some days later, on July 31, the band announced their second studio album Carry On, scheduled for a release on August 28, 2020.

On August 28, 2020, the band released Carry On and debuted their new merchandise.

2021–present: Metamorph and Bad Days
The band's songs "Unstoppable" and "The Champion" were played at Super Bowl LV in February 2021.

The Score released their single, "Victorious" on June 25, 2021. They released another single, "Head Up", on July 23, 2021, and "Top of the World" on August 20, 2021.  These songs were included on the band's EP Chrysalis, which was released on September 24, 2021. This EP includes these previously released songs and two new songs: Pull the Cord and Good to be Alive.

The Score released their single, "Alarm", on October 22, 2021, and another single titled "Big Dreams" featuring FITZ on December 9, 2021. They released the single "Enemies" on January 14, 2022.

The band's third album, Metamorph, was released on March 18, 2022.

The band released a new single in collaboration with DREAMERS titled "Bad Days" on July 22, 2022. Along with the release of the single, the band announced a U.S. tour called "No More Bad Days". The band is also scheduled to perform on the Dude Perfect Cruise (Aka Cruise Perfect)

Members
Eddie Anthony Ramirez Jr. - lead vocals, guitar, (2011–present)
Edan Chai Dover - keys, production, backing vocals (2011–present)

Touring Members
Chris Coombs - guitar, backing vocals 
Logan Baldwin - drums, percussion

Discography

Studio albums

Extended plays

Singles

Music videos

References

External links

Spotify
Apple Music

American alternative rock groups
Indie pop groups from Los Angeles
Republic Records artists
Musical groups from Los Angeles
Musical groups from New York City
Musical groups established in 2011
2011 establishments in New York City